U.S. Route 30 (US 30) is a United States Numbered Highway that runs from Astoria, Oregon, to Atlantic City, New Jersey. In the state of Ohio, it is a major, east–west highway that runs through the northern section of the state. Overall, the highway runs through rural areas dominated by farm fields or woodlands; some segments are urban in character in the Mansfield and Canton areas.

The first transportation route along US 30 in the state was the Lincoln Highway. In the early 1920s, the corridor was two different state routes in the initial state route system. When the United States Numbered Highway System was first designated on November 11, 1926, the new US 30 replaced the other designations along its route. Since creation, the road has been moved and realigned several times. Starting in the early 1950s, various sections were upgraded to freeways, bypassing several cities and villages in the area. Future improvements to the route of US 30 includes a proposed easterly extension of the four-lane divided highway from Canton to State Route 11 (SR 11), near Lisbon.

Route description

US 30 runs for  through northern Ohio. Between the Indiana state line and Canton, US 30 is a divided highway, with sections of freeway between Van Wert and Delphos; Upper Sandusky and Mansfield; around Wooster; and a final section in the area of Massillon and Canton. Like other state routes, it is maintained by the Ohio Department of Transportation (ODOT). All of US 30 in the state has been listed on the National Highway System.

The portion of US 30 within Hancock County is designated the "Congressman Michael G. Oxley Memorial Highway", in honor of the late former U.S. representative, who was born in and represented that area of Ohio.

Indiana to Upper Sandusky
US 30 enters Ohio heading southeast, as a four-lane divided highway passing through rural farmland. The highway passes through southwestern Paulding County before reaching its first intersection,  into the state, on the Van Wert County line; generally north is Benton Road (Township Road 11), in Paulding County's Benton Township; generally south is Klinger Road (TR 21), in Van Wert County's Tully Township. The route crosses Blue and Middle creeks before it begins a short concurrency with State Route 49 (SR 49). Midway through the concurrency, the Lincoln Highway departs US 30 onto a former routing. After SR 49 leaves the concurrency, US 30 crosses Upper Prairie and Hagerman creeks. Immediately after, the Lincoln Highway, which had paralleled, curves around and overpasses US 30. Shortly after, there is an eastbound weigh station, followed by rest areas in both directions. The route then crosses two branches of Hoaglin Creek. US 30 has a trumpet interchange with US 224; this interchange is the western end of the US 224 concurrency. The road curves toward the east, crossing Maddox and Town creeks, passing near commercial properties on the north side of Van Wert. The concurrency ends at a folded diamond interchange with US 127. US 224 heads north concurrent with US 127. US 30 is overpassed by Franklin Street/Marsh Road and Stripe Road, passes through farmland and curves southeasterly, becoming a limited-access road. While heading southeasterly the road is overpassed by Gilliland Road, then has a diamond interchange with the Lincoln Highway. Next it is overpassed by Hoaglin Center Road. US 30 turns towards the east, crossing Spice Run, being overpassed by Gamble and Chenowith roads and again crossing Spice Run. The highway is overpassed by Ringwald Road, then crosses Dog Creek. US 30 next overpasses Dog Creek Road and is overpassed by the Lincoln Highway, reaching a diamond interchange with Middle Point Wetzel Road. Next, the highway is overpassed by Converse Roselm, Bockey and John Brickner roads. The route then crosses over the Little Auglaize River. After the river, the road is overpassed by Shenk Road and has a diamond interchange with SR 66, providing access to Delphos.

US 30 curves southeasterly, crossing West Jennings Creek, then enters Putnam County, crossing Jennings Creek and Flat Fork. The highway overpasses SR 190, but there is no direct access between the two routes; it then overpasses Jennings TR U-20. US 30 then enters Allen County and has a diamond interchange with the Lincoln Highway, which also provides access to Delphos. US 30 has an incomplete interchange with SR 309. After SR 309, US 30 becomes four-lane highway with cross-street traffic. The road crosses over the Auglaize River, Leatherwood Ditch and the Ottawa River. The highway now has a mix of intersections and grade separations; it is overpassed by Gomer and Sandy Point roads. Then it crosses Pike Run and meets Watkins Road at an intersection. Next, it has a diamond interchange with SR 115, crosses Sugar Creek and has a diamond interchange with SR 65. US 30 crosses over a Norfolk Southern railroad track and is overpassed by Stewart Road, followed by rest areas in both directions, then is overpassed by Slabtown Road. The route then comes to Mayberry Road; the north leg of the road connects to westbound US 30 at a RIRO junction; as there is no median crossover, there is no direct access to or from the eastbound lanes. The south leg of Mayberry Road truncates at a cul-de-sac short of US 30. Next is Thayer Road, whose junction is a restricted crossing U-turn (RCUT). The design of this junction does not allow direct left turns from US 30 to Thayer Road: instead, all movements at this junction are accomplished by right turns, right turns followed by U-turns at designated median crossovers, or U-turns followed by right turns.
US 30 crosses over Interstate 75 (as well as over Napoleon Road), with no access to I-75 at this location. US 30 and I-75 parallel each other for a short distance, before I-75 curves towards the north. After I-75 curves north, US 30 has an interchange with SR 696; this interchange provides access to both I-75 and the village of Beaverdam. The road continues east, overpassed by Swaney Road and overpassing Phillips, Pevee and Bentley roads before crossing Little Riley Creek. US 30 then enters Hancock County and has intersections with CR 15, Orange TR 51 and Orange TR 52. Next, the route has a diamond interchange with SR 235. There follow intersections with Orange TR 56, CR 12, Van Buren TR 61, CR 9 and Madison TR 68.

US 30 has a folded diamond interchange with US 68, immediately south of Williamstown. After US 68, US 30 crosses over a CSX railroad track and then has intersections with Madison TR 177 and CR 183, overpasses Delaware TR 185, has an intersection with Delaware TR 186 and then crosses over the Blanchard River. The highway has a diamond interchange with SR 37, before crossing into Wyandot County. There follow intersections with CR 78, Richland TR 79 and CR 81, and is overpassed by SR 293; there is no direct connection between the two routes. US 30 overpasses CR 96, crosses Perkins Run, overpasses CR 97, crosses Oak Run and Tymochtee Creek, and has an intersection with Salem TR 103. The route curves toward the northeast and has a diamond interchange with the Lincoln Highway (CR 330). Next, Salem TR 49 overpasses the highway. US 30 has an interchange with US 23, this interchange is the western end of the concurrency with US 23. US 23 and US 30 head due east crossing over a CSX railroad track and having a folded diamond interchange with SR 199. The concurrency has an interchange with SR 53/SR 67, before the road curves towards the southeast. The highway crosses over the Sandusky River, then CR 121 is served by a pair of RIRO junctions. US 30 then has an diamond interchange with the Lincoln Highway, before curving towards the south. The concurrency with US 23 ends at an interchange east of Upper Sandusky.

Upper Sandusky to Canton

US 30 heads due east as a four-lane divided highway with cross-road traffic, passing through farmland. The road has an interchange with SR 231, before crossing into Crawford County. After entering into Crawford County, US 30 becomes a four-lane limited access freeway, continues passing through farmland. The highway crosses over Chicago, Fort Wayne and Eastern Railroad track, followed by an interchange with SR 4/SR 19/SR 100. The route crosses over a Norfolk Southern railroad track and has an interchange with SR 98. After the interchange with SR 98, US 30 crosses over a Chicago, Fort Wayne and Eastern railroad track and the Sandusky River again. The road has an interchange at SR 602, followed by an interchange with SR 598. The road crosses over a CSX railroad tracks, followed by an interchange with SR 61. US 30 passes under SR 181 and SR 314, with no access to either route. After passing under SR 314 the route enters the city of Mansfield. The route has an incomplete interchange with SR 309, followed by an interchange at SR 39. After SR 39, US 30 crosses over a Norfolk Southern railroad track and has an interchange with SR 13, followed by an interchange with SR 545.

US 30 has an interchange with US 42 and I-71. The road leaves Mansfield and becomes a four-lane highway with cross-street traffic. The highway has an intersection with SR 603 and an intersection with SR 511. The route has an interchange with SR 60. The road has an intersection with SR 89. US 30 has an interchange with US 250, and the two routes continue concurrent towards the east. The highway enters Wooster and has an interchange with SR 3. After the interchange at SR 3, the route passes over Norfolk Southern railroad tracks, before having an interchange with SR 302. The road parallels a river, before having an interchange with the eastern end of the US 250 concurrency and the eastern end of the SR 3 concurrency. US 30 leaves Wooster and passes through farmland. The highway has a traffic signal at a T-intersection with SR 57. The route enters Dalton and has a T-intersection with the western terminus of US 30 Alternate.

US 30 bypasses most of Dalton to the south, having a traffic signal at SR 94. The highway has a T-intersection with the eastern terminus of US 30 Alternate. US 30 has an interchange with SR 172, and US 30 becomes a four-lane highway with limited access. The highway passes over SR 93, with no access between the two routes. US 30 has an interchange with SR 241, this interchange provides access to SR 93. East of the interchange at SR 241, US 30 crosses over the Tuscarawas River and has an interchange at US 62/SR 21, US 62 continues east concurrent with US 30. The route has an interchange with SR 627, the western terminus of SR 627, followed by an interchange with SR 297, the southern terminus of SR 297. After US 30/US 62 passes over SR 297, with interchange access, the route enters the city of Canton. US 30 has an interchange with I-77, this interchange is also the eastern end of the US 62 concurrency. East of I-77, US 30 has a short concurrency with SR 43. The four-lane divided highway with limited access ends at an interchange with Trump Avenue. US 30 heads north on Trump Avenue, as a four-lane highway with a center turn lane. US 30 has a traffic signal at SR 172, at this traffic signal US 30 turns east onto SR 172. This is the eastern end of a long stretch of US 30 that is at least four lanes (excluding ramps); the western end of this stretch is in the Chicago suburb of New Lenox, Illinois.

Canton to West Virginia

US 30 and SR 172 head east as a two-lane highway, passing through mostly residential properties. US 30 enters East Canton, where US 30 turns south onto Cedar Street, while SR 172 continues east. The route turns onto Walnut Street and one block later has a traffic signal at SR 44; this is the west end of the concurrency with SR 44. The two routes head southeast passing through woodland and paralleling a Wheeling and Lake Erie railroad track. SR 44 turns south and US 30 continues southeasterly, passing through woodland and farmland, with houses. The road passes through Robertsville and curves towards the northeast, before curving back towards the southeast. The highway enters Minerva and passes through residential and commercial properties. In Minerva, the route curves northeasterly and has an at-grade crossing with an Ohi-Rail railroad track. The highway curves towards the east and has an at-grade crossing with a Norfolk Southern railroad crossing. After the second railroad crossing the highway passes through East Rochester. After East Rochester US 30 passes through farmland and woodland, paralleling a Norfolk Southern railroad track.

US 30 has a four-way stop at an intersection with SR 9 and SR 644, in Kensington. SR 9 and US 30 head northeast concurrent heading towards Hanoverton. In Hanoverton SR 9 turns due north and US 30 continues northeasterly, before turning easterly. US 30 enters Lisbon over Little Beaver Creek and is signed as Lincoln Way passing through residential properties. As the highway enters downtown the properties become more commercial in type. In downtown, US 30 has a traffic signal at SR 45/SR 164/SR 154. This intersection is the southern terminus for SR 517 and the western terminus for SE 154. SR 45/SR 154 continues east concurrent with US 30. The concurrency passes through a few more blocks of commercial properties, before entering residential properties. The concurrency with SR 154 ends, when US 30 and SR 45 turn southeasterly and SR 154 continues east towards Elkton and SR 11. The highway leaves Lisbon and passes through woodland as a two-lane highway. At West Point, US 30 turns easterly and SR 45 continues towards the south, just before an interchange with SR 11.

US 30 enters SR 11 and the concurrency heads towards the southeast, as a four-lane divided highway with limited access, passing through woodland. The route has an interchange at SR 7, this is the northern end of the SR 7 concurrency. The highway enters East Liverpool and has an interchange with SR 7 and SR 39. This interchange is the southern terminus of the SR 7 concurrency and the western end of the SR 39 concurrency. The road curves towards the east and parallels the Ohio River and Norfolk Southern railroad tracks. The highway curves towards the northeast and has an interchange with SR 39, the eastern end of the concurrency with that state route. US 30 and SR 11 curve towards the southeast and cross over the railroad tracks, before crossing the Ohio River on the Jennings Randolph Bridge and into West Virginia; SR 11 ends at the state line.

History
The Lincoln Highway was the first route to follow the corridor of US 30 in Ohio. The Lincoln Highway was established in 1913, following the current route of SR 309 and SR 81. Improvements and realignment to the highway were planned in 1917 and was to start in the spring of 1918. The route was built to relieve some of the railroad congestion. The Lincoln Highway realignment project was completed in 1939 and moved the Lincoln Highway to the modern US 30 corridor. The Lincoln Highway in Ohio became known as SR 5 between Indiana state line and Mansfield, SR 10 between Mansfield and Wooster, and SR 5 between Wooster and Pennsylvania. In 1925, the Federal Highway Association was established and one year later US 30 was established. US 30 followed the current route of SR 309. US 30 eastern terminus in Ohio was relocated to the West Virginia state line, in 1928. The route became divided in 1932, with US 30N taking the current alignment of US 30 and US 30S taking the current alignment of SR 309.

The bypass around the south side of Dalton was completed in December 1953. In 1966 and 1967 a four-lane section of US 30 opened between SR 49 and US 224. US 30 became a four-lane highway between Indiana state line and SR 49 in 1969. Between 1970 and 1971, US 30 between Delphos and Beaverdam was completed. In 1971 the section of road between current SR 172, West of East Greenville, and SR 21 was open to traffic. The divided routes were removed in 1974 with US 30S, becoming SR 309 and US 30N becoming US 30. In 1979 the section of four-lane road between Van Wert and Delphos open to traffic. Also in 1979 US 30 between Dalton and the I-77 interchange was upgraded to a four-lane divided highway and opened to traffic. Between 1983 and 1985 the section from I-77 to Trump Avenue was opened to traffic. In 1999 a four-lane section of US 30 was opened between SR 696 and SR 235. The highways between Upper Sandusky and Ontario was upgraded to a four-lane limited access highway and open in 2004 and 2005. During 2007 and 2008, the upgraded section of US 30 between SR 235 and Upper Sandusky, was opened to traffic.

In an effort to improve safety and reduce crashes at Thayer Road, which had crossed US 30 north of Lima in Allen County, ODOT converted the intersection to a restricted crossing U-turn (RCUT), completing the task in late October 2021 at a cost of $2.3 million. The version of the RCUT used does not allow direct left turns from US 30 to Thayer Road. To the west of Thayer Road, the south leg of former crossroad Mayberry Road was truncated to a cul-de-sac short of US 30 and its median crossover was closed, leaving the north leg of Mayberry Road directly accessible only to the westbound lanes of US 30 as a RIRO intersection. To the east of Thayer Road, both legs of former crossroad Cool Road were truncated to cul-de-sacs and direct access to US 30 was closed entirely. These changes eliminate all cross traffic and turns across opposing traffic for the stretch of US 30 between the interchange at SR 115 and the intersection at County Road 15 just across the Hancock County line.

Future
The section of US 30 between Canton and SR 11 has been studied many times for upgrades since at least 1989, including 1991, 1993, 1995,  1996,  and 2010. In 2012, the ODOT was studying the section again, with plans to create a toll highway along the corridor. Plans to toll the future highway were rejected in 2013. The expansion was discussed further in 2014, with a consensus brewing that local funding must be involved for the project to go ahead. In September 2016 the director of the Ohio Department of Transportation approved a regional transportation improvement project allowing the counties of Stark, Carroll, and Columbiana, the three counties along the corridor, to work collectively to secure funding for the extension.

In 2019 a $300 million federally funded project was announced to extend the freeway section of US 30 from Trump Avenue to SR 44. The proposal and funding is set to eliminate a large portion of traffic that travels through East Canton. In 2021 the Stark County Area Transportation Study metropolitan planning organization recommended that US 30 be relocated to as far as East Rochester on a combination of two- and four-lane facilities.

Major intersections

Related routes
U.S. Route 30N (former)
U.S. Route 30S (former)

References

External links

 Ohio
30
Transportation in Paulding County, Ohio
Transportation in Van Wert County, Ohio
Transportation in Allen County, Ohio
Transportation in Hancock County, Ohio
Transportation in Wyandot County, Ohio
Transportation in Crawford County, Ohio
Transportation in Richland County, Ohio
Transportation in Ashland County, Ohio
Transportation in Wayne County, Ohio
Transportation in Stark County, Ohio
Transportation in Columbiana County, Ohio
U.S. Route 030 in Ohio